The rainbow skink (Trachylepis margaritifera) is a species of Afro-Malagasy mabuya or skink in the subfamily Lygosominae.

Taxonomy
Mabuya quinquetaeniata margaritifera, formerly a subspecies of Trachylepis quinquetaeniata (the five-lined mabuya, also known as the rainbow skink), was elevated to full species in 1998 (as Trachylepis margaritifera).

Description

The coloration of this species is quite variable, depending on the gender and the age. The scales are glossy, with metallic reflections. The basic colour is usually olive-brown or dark brown, sometimes with pearly whitish spots and with three light yellow-orange longitudinal stripes running from the head to the electric blue tail. These stripes may fade and become indistinct in the adults.

The head shows a pointed snout and clearly visible ears holes. Just behind the ear opening, there are some black spots. Legs are dark brown, short and strong, with relatively long toes. The flanks are mainly yellowish and the underside of the body is whitish.

Distribution
It is found in southern Africa, from KwaZulu-Natal in South Africa to southern Malawi; isolated populations occur in central to southeastern Tanzania and southern Kenya. It is found in rocky and mountainous regions of these countries.

References

External links
BioLib.cz – Trachylepis margaritifera
Snake-pit
Le terrarium

Trachylepis
Reptiles described in 1854
Taxa named by Wilhelm Peters
Taxobox binomials not recognized by IUCN